The Marrying Kind is a 1952 comedy-drama film directed by George Cukor, starring Judy Holliday and Aldo Ray. Other cast members include John Alexander, Charles Bronson, Peggy Cass, Barry Curtis, Tom Farrell, Frank Ferguson, Ruth Gordon (who co-wrote the screenplay with Garson Kanin), Gordon Jones, Madge Kennedy, Nancy Kulp, Mickey Shaughnessy, and Joan Shawlee.

Plot summary

The ups and downs of marriage and commitment are realized as Florence and Chet Keefer recount their marriage to the divorce judge. As the judge attempts to decipher whether or not their love for one another is gone, key moments of their lives together are recalled.

Florence and Chet came close to making it big at various times, and suffered when those opportunities were lost. But the biggest stressor on their marriage occurred when their son drowned in a lake. They recover from his death as well as they can, and Florrie returns to work while Chet is recuperating from an injury. When Florrie's former boss leaves her a lot of money in his will, Chet is concerned about what the context might have been. They fight over the money, and though their daughter tries to stop their arguments, things boil to a head. When they go to their family for advice, it seems divorce makes the most sense.

After talking it all through with the judge, they realize that they never really wanted to get divorced in the first place. After the judge leaves, Florrie and Chet resolve to try again and not blame each other when things go wrong.

Cast
 Judy Holliday as Florence "Florrie" Keefer
 Aldo Ray as Chet Keefer
 Madge Kennedy as Judge Anne B. Carroll
 Sheila Bond as Joan Shipley
 John Alexander as Howard Shipley
 Rex Williams as George Bastian
 Phyllis Povah as Mrs. Derringer
 Mickey Shaughnessy as Pat Bundy
 Griff Barnett as Charley
 Peggy Cass as Emily Bundy
 Nancy Kulp as Edie

Shooting locations
Several exteriors were shot on location in New York City, including in Central Park and in Stuyvesant Town-Peter Cooper Village.

Narration
The main way the action in this film happens is by narration, as Florence or Chet describe for the Judge different situations. However, as the viewer sees those scenes portrayed in the film, what they are seeing is different from what the narrator is describing. In the case of the story of how they met, what Chet describes is completely different from what is shown happening. '"It so happens I remember it different", Miss Holliday primly says.'

Creative process
Garson Kanin told the Los Angeles Times that he and Ruth Gordon had a different writing process for The Marrying Kind than usual - they worked on it little by little over a period of months. They'd sketch out this or that scene to make a certain point. Then on a train ride they started compiling all their ideas, and found out they had 'far too much' material. '"Sometimes we rewrite each other's stuff," Miss Gordon said, expressionlessly. "Every time I put in what I thought was a great joke, he cut it out." "It wasn't that funny," Kanin said.'  Bosley Crowther of The New York Times notes that Miss Gordon and Mr. Kanin successfully convey their moral - 'that the natural and ever-hopeful chase after glittering, material ambition is a wistful and endless dream'.

Critical response
The Marrying Kind received mainly positive reviews. Mae Tinee of the Chicago Tribune described the film as having "a great many funny situations and some expert dialog," while also capturing perfectly "the frictions and frustrations which affect a middle class couple in what is aptly described as 'a nervous world.'" The Deseret News notes the film as "a heartwarming story of a young couple in love." Marjory Adams of The Boston Globe positively noted the humor of certain scenes, but stated in conclusion that "you would never wish to include Miss Holliday and Mr. Ray in your list of acquaintances. They would be too exhausting." Bosley Crowther of The New York Times remarked on the successful hilarities, and the contrast between moments and the "bittersweet comprehension of the thorniness of the way that stretches out for two young people after they have taken marriage vows."

References

External links
 
 
 
 

1952 films
1952 comedy-drama films
American black-and-white films
American comedy-drama films
Columbia Pictures films
1950s English-language films
Films about divorce
Films about marriage
Films directed by George Cukor
Films scored by Hugo Friedhofer
Films set in New York City
Films shot in New York City
1950s American films